Troy Pezet (born 24 April 1974) is an Australian former professional rugby league footballer who played as a  for the Parramatta Eels and the South Queensland Crushers in the 1990s.

Playing career
Pezet started his first grade career at the now defunct South Queensland side.  

Pezet was a member of the South Queensland teams to finish last on the table in 1996,1997 and was also a member of the final ever game The Crushers played in, a 39–18 victory over the Western Suburbs Magpies.  

In 1998, Pezet moved to Parramatta where he spent one season with before retiring at the end of the year.

Post playing
Pezet is now currently working for the Newcastle Knights as their elite pathways recruitment manager.

References

1974 births
Living people
Australian rugby league players
Parramatta Eels players
Rugby league halfbacks
South Queensland Crushers players
Place of birth missing (living people)